The 2022–23 24H Middle East Trophy Series is the first season of the 24H Middle East Trophy Series, presented by Creventic. The race are contested with GT3-spec cars, GT4-spec cars, sports cars, 24H-Specials, like silhouette cars, TCR Touring Cars, TCX cars and TC cars.

Calendar

Teams and drivers

GT

TCE

Race Results
Bold indicates overall winner.

References

Notes

External links

2022 in motorsport
2023 in motorsport
2022 in 24H Series
2023 in 24H Series
2023 in Emirati motorsport